Microrchestris is a genus of Namibian huntsman spiders that was first described by R. F. Lawrence in 1962.  it contains two species, found in Namibia: M. melanogaster and M. scutatus.

See also
 List of Sparassidae species

References

Araneomorphae genera
Sparassidae